The Guardian is a 1990 American supernatural horror film co-written and directed by William Friedkin, and starring Jenny Seagrove as a mysterious nanny who is hired by new parents, played by Dwier Brown and Carey Lowell, to care for their infant son; the couple soon discover the nanny to be a Hamadryad, whose previous clients' children went missing under her care. The film is based on the novel The Nanny, by Dan Greenburg.

Director Sam Raimi was originally attached to the project, before dropping out to direct Darkman. Heavily marketed as director Friedkin's first foray into the horror genre since 1973's The Exorcist, the film had a troubled production, with the script undergoing changes that continued well into the shooting process.

The film was released in the spring of 1990, and had a generally unfavorable critical reception, later making Roger Ebert's "most hated films" list. A cable television version of the film was credited to "Alan Von Smithee", due to Friedkin's wish to disassociate himself from its release. Although a critical and commercial failure, the film later found an audience as a cult film.

Plot
Molly and Allan Sheridan leave their two children in the care of a new nanny, Diana Julian. Diana, who is in fact an ancient Hamadryad, kidnaps their infant daughter, taking her to a forest where she approaches a giant, gnarled tree, serving the child as a human sacrifice to sustain the tree's life. Diana's reflection as she stares into a pool of water transforms to that of a growling wolf.

Three months later, Phil and Kate Sterling have recently relocated from Chicago to Los Angeles, where Phil has taken a lucrative advertising job. Kate becomes pregnant, and gives birth to a son, Jake. The couple decide to hire a nanny to allow each of them to maintain their jobs, and interview two clients through a nanny agency: a young woman named Arlene, and a caring English woman, Camilla. When Arlene dies in a bicycling accident, Camilla is swiftly hired and becomes an invaluable member of the Sterlings' household.

One afternoon while Camilla rests in a meadow with Jake, she is approached by three aggressive bikers who attempt to sexually assault her. She flees to the base of the gnarled tree, which subsequently comes to life, its branches strangling and eviscerating the men. Wolves consume one of their entrails, and another is impaled by the tree's root and then bursts into flame. During a dinner party some days later, Ned, the Sterlings' neighbor who designed their home, invites Camilla on a date, which she declines. That night, Phil has a nightmare in which he has sex with Camilla. The next day, moments after Camilla leaves to go shopping, Ned stops by the house with a bouquet of flowers for her. Kate explains she just left on foot, and Ned drives after her, catching sight of her fleeing into the forest. Ned pursues her, eventually coming across her bathing in the creek. He watches as Camilla approaches the large tree, and begins to fuse with the tree bark. A pack of wolves pursue Ned, who flees back to his house. He leaves a rambling phone message for Phil and Kate. Moments later, Camilla appears, naked and ashen, on the hearth, before the wolves break into the home, eating him alive. Camilla drags his remains away.

When checking the answering machine the following morning, Phil finds two messages: One from a stranger, Molly Sheridan, who says it is urgent she speak with him. The next is Ned's, which is incoherent, but Camilla interrupts him from finishing listening to it. Phil meets with Molly the next day. She describes the disappearance of her infant daughter, as well as the nanny Diana, whom she came to discover was a false identity. She requests that Phil arrange for her to see Camilla, suspecting they are the same person. When Phil returns home, he listens to Ned's message in full, which warns him against letting Camilla back in the house. Discovering Ned is missing, Phil confronts Camilla in front of Kate, but Jake grows violently ill during the confrontation and has to be rushed to the hospital, exhibiting coma-like symptoms.

Jake regains consciousness in the hospital, and Camilla attempts to kidnap him, but Phil intercepts, throwing Camilla to the ground. Phil and Kate depart with Jake, and upon arriving home are confronted by a pack of wolves. Kate flees to the couple's Jeep, while Phil runs toward the woods with Jake, as Camilla pursues them both, levitating through the forest, until they reach the large tree. Kate chases after them in the Jeep, eventually hitting and killing Camilla. As Phil examines Camilla's body, he notices faces of babies embossed in the tree bark.

Later, a detective tells the couple no evidence of Camilla's existence can be found. Phil decides to cut down the tree with a chainsaw, but in his absence, Kate is attacked by Camilla—now part-tree, part-human—who has again infiltrated the house. As Phil attempts to cut the tree, the branches entangle him and begin to bleed as he inflicts damage on them. The damage concurrently impacts Camilla, who is fighting Kate. When Phil saws off a large branch, Camilla's leg severs from her body, allowing Kate to push her out a window. Simultaneously, Phil manages to fell the tree, but it combusts before landing, as Camilla's body similarly disintegrates before hitting the ground. A bloodied Phil drops the chainsaw and returns home as Kate picks up Jake. Seeing the mess in the house, Phil realizes what happened as he is reunited with his wife and son now knowing with Camilla finally died, his family is now safe.

Cast

Production

Filming
The Guardian was shot on location in Los Angeles and Santa Clarita, California. The forest location featured in the film was shot at a nature preserve in Valencia, California, near Six Flags Magic Mountain.

Script changes
The original script for The Guardian bore a closer resemblance to its source material, The Nanny by novelist Dan Greenburg, which told the story of a nanny who steals children. According to screenwriter Stephen Volk, Sam Raimi was originally attached to the picture. Raimi had dropped out of the production to direct Darkman, at which point William Friedkin was brought in to direct. The script, which had originally been conceived as a tongue-in-cheek thriller for Raimi, eventually "metamorphosed into something different" during the course of filming, as Friedkin made numerous changes. Volk attempted to rework the script for Friedkin, initially re-writing the character of the nanny as a real-life Lilith, the child-stealing demon from Jewish mythology. Friedkin dismissed the idea, and Volk then reworked the script into a straightforward psychological thriller about an unhinged woman stealing children; however, Universal Pictures objected to the reworking, stating that they wanted a "supernatural" horror film given Friedkin's reputation for The Exorcist (1973). Amidst the shifting script, Friedkin began auditioning for the role of Camilla. Uma Thurman was originally a candidate for the role prior to the script changes. After Volk suggested using elements from the M.R. James story "The Ash-tree" in the script, Friedkin became fixated on incorporating a tree into Camilla's backstory. Volk reportedly suffered a nervous breakdown and left the production, leaving Friedkin to finish the script's loose ends after filming had already begun.

In a 2015 interview, Jenny Seagrove recalled visiting Friedkin at his home in Los Angeles, where he told her he had been reading about Druid mythology and wanted to incorporate it into the film. According to Seagrove: "Pages were flying at us [...] and then suddenly this idea of this weird kind of tree came about, and suddenly my character was not just a nanny but she was a Druid character who turned into a part of the tree, and she had to feed the tree—things were evolving all the time."

Special effects
Seagrove underwent numerous extensive makeup transformations in the film, at times covered in tree bark during the metamorphosing scenes. The tree featured in the film was constructed by the special effects department in Burbank, California, and transported to the nature preserve in Valencia. The tree contained tubes of circulating fake blood in order for the tree to properly "bleed" when cut.

Alternate endings
The television version of the film ends with Phil and Kate returning home from the hospital with Jake, while Camilla is alive and naked at the tree. Director William Friedkin disapproved of the television cut of the film, and removed his name from the credits, naming "Alan von Smithee" as the director.

The video and DVD versions have the full ending, in which Camilla appears in her true form and tries to take the baby from Kate, but Phil cuts down the tree with a chainsaw, thus killing both it and Camilla.

Release
The Guardian was released in North American cinemas on April 27, 1990, opening at #3 at the box office, on 1,684 screens, with a USD$5,565,620 weekend. The film went on to gross a total of $17,037,887 domestically.

Critical response
The Guardian earned mostly negative reviews from critics, and holds a 27% rating on review aggregator Rotten Tomatoes from 11 reviews. Roger Ebert of the Chicago Sun-Times gave the film one star out of four, and later named it as one of his "Most Hated Films". Janet Maslin of The New York Times gave the film a middling review, saying "[Friedkin] never sustains the story's tension for very long, and even cuts off the scarier episodes before they have a chance to sink in. What's more, he never offers a consistent idea of what sort of evil is at work here."

The Washington Post also gave the film a negative review, stating: "the plot is so preposterous that The Guardian never comes close to grabbing attention, empathy or sympathy." David Kehr of the Chicago Tribune wrote: "Like The Exorcist, The Guardian is a horror story set in the bosom of the nuclear family, and it, too, tries to exploit a culturewide fear, turning a shared guilt into monstrous projection. The guilt of The Guardian, however, is far more mundane and far less gripping than The Exorcists agony over our abandonment of the church." Jay Carr of The Boston Globe wrote that the film was "pretty good claptrap," but noted that "as it makes its way to a bloody payoff, it loses immediacy and individuality, subsiding into bloody cliche."

Time Out said in their review of the film: "Friedkin opts for up-front hokum, interspersed with impressively ridiculous special effects, including man-eating trees, flying nannies and coniferous chainsaw carnage. A severely flawed but not unamusing venture from a director who should know better."

Actress Jenny Seagrove said of the film in retrospect, "I don't want to put off anyone from watching it because it is good fun," but noted that, during the first screening, "there was a feeling in the room that it wasn't the sort of picture everyone had hoped it was going to be." She also said: "It has become a cult film, but the screenplay was appalling. It was being written on the hoof."

To the question "Which films were the farthest?" on his career, William Friedkin cited The Guardian and simply said about it: "The Guardian I don’t think works."

Home media
The Guardian was released on VHS by MCA Universal home video in October 1990. It was later licensed by Universal for a DVD release through Anchor Bay Entertainment, released it on October 12, 1999. The DVD features an audio commentary by director Friedkin, as well as the original theatrical trailer. This release has been long out of print and is difficult to obtain, although a UK DVD by Second Sight, also featuring Friedkin's commentary, has subsequently become widely available.

The film was released on Blu-ray for the first time by Shout Factory on January 19, 2016. A UK Blu-ray by Final Cut Entertainment is due for release in October, 2018.

See also
 Druid

References

Works cited

External links

1990 films
1990 horror films
1990 thriller films
American horror thriller films
American supernatural horror films
1990s English-language films
Films about trees
Films based on American horror novels
Films based on classical mythology
Films directed by William Friedkin
Films credited to Alan Smithee
Films set in Los Angeles
Films shot in Los Angeles
Films about nannies
Universal Pictures films
1990s American films